The 1996–97 Slovenian Basketball League was the sixth season of the Premier A Slovenian Basketball League, the highest professional basketball league in Slovenia.

Regular season

P=Matches played, W=Matches won, L=Matches lost, F=Points for, A=Points against, Pts=Points

Champions standings

Group A

P=Matches played, W=Matches won, L=Matches lost, F=Points for, A=Points against, Pts=Points

Group B

P=Matches played, W=Matches won, L=Matches lost, F=Points for, A=Points against, Pts=Points

Playoffs

Best shooters

External links
Official Basketball Federation of Slovenia website 

Slovenian Basketball League seasons
Slovenia
1996–97 in Slovenian basketball